The  Lufttransportdienst des Bundes  (LTDB)  (English: Swiss Federal Government's air transport service, (LTDB) French:Service de transport aérien de la Conféderation, (STAC)),operates the aircraft and helicopters of the Swiss government.
The LTDB is located at Bern Airport. Since 2005, the LTDB has been part of the Swiss Air Force. Prior to that, she was assigned to the Federal Office of Civil Aviation.

History
With the appointment of Messerschmitt Bf 109 fighter aircraft in 1938, the Swiss Air Force also ordered 15 Messerschmitt Bf 108B typhoons to rephrase the pilots. With their four-seat cabin, the Me-108 received the secondary task of transporting high military forces between the military airfields. After the war diplomatic guests were also transported.

In the middle of the 1950s the fatigue damage accumulated. Therefore, the Swiss Air Force procured three Beechcraft Twin Bonanza E-50 as a replacement. These were also used to transport federal committees. The aircraft served for 30 years. Until the introduction of the Eurocopter AS332 Super Puma, three Junkers Ju 52, which were procured in 1939, also took these tasks along with other tasks. In 1987 the Swiss Air Force bought from the Rega  two Learjet 35A. One of these aircraft remained in the service in the Swiss Air Force until 2006.

By combining the fleet of the Federal Office of Civil Aviation, which was responsible for state flights, the Swiss Air Force took over this task on 1 January 2005 and thus also part of the aircraft fleet. These received, for example, the Eurocopter AS365 Dauphin a military tailnumber.

Fleet 
The fleet of the LTDB includes two jet aircraft, three turboprop aircraft and two helicopters. The former are mainly used for the VIP transport, in particular by members of the Federal Council, which is why they are often called  Bundesratsjets  . However, they are also used for other purposes, for example for deportation or to support international peacekeeping missions. The jets are the Dassault Falcon 900EX (T-785) and Cessna Citation Excel (T-784) Which can accommodate up to six passengers each. a Pilatus PC-24 (T-786). The aircraft were put into service in September 2002, May 2013 and in Dezember 2018 respectively. It is intended to replace the Beech 1900 with two Former REGA CL 604 ( T-751 & T-752), Former HB-JRB & HB-JRC. (T-786), in April 2019.
The two turboprops DHC-6 Twin Otter (T-741) and Beechcraft Super King Air (T-721) are usually not used for VIP flights, but for transporting other passengers as well as for the As well as for Swisstopo. The Beechcraft 1900 (T-729) is used for the same tasks apart from the Swisstopo. If necessary, the Swiss Air Force/Federal Air Transport Service can also use the Pilatus PC-12 HB-FOG of Armasuisse for transport tasks. Also the armasuisse DA-42 OPA (R-711) could be used as lieson aircraft.

The two own Eurocopter EC 135 (T-351 and T-352) are used as helicopters.

The Luftwaffe also serves the aircraft of the Federal Office for Civil Aviation at Belp Airport, which has its home airport there. These are the following aircraft and helicopters:
 HB-GPC Beechcraft Baron 58
 HB-KEY Robin DR400 /500
 HB-KEZ Robin DR400 /500
 HB-KIA Beechcraft Bonanza A36
 HB-POP Piper PA-46 350P Malibu Mirage
 HB-XQE AgustaWestland AW109E
 HB-XVA Eurocopter AS350 ÉcureuilB2
 HB-ZKO AgustaWestland AW119 Koala
 HB-FWA Pilatus PC-12

References

External links 

 Official website
 Regulation on the air transport service of the Confederation
Flieger-Flab-Museum

Swiss Air Force
Dübendorf
Military units and formations established in 2005